On The West Side is the debut solo album by the Scottish folk rock artist Donnie Munro, former lead singer of the band, Runrig. It was released in 1999.

Track listing
 "On The West Side" (Donnie Munro) – 4:44
 "Chì Mi'n Tìr" ("I See The Land") (traditional, arr. by Donnie Munro, Chris Harley, Allan Cuthbertson) – 4:08
 "Morning Light" (Donnie Munro) – 7:45
 "Catch The Wind" (Donovan Leitch) – 3:59
 "Fields of the Young" (Donnie Munro, Richard Cherns) – 5:00
 "Nuair Bha Mi Òg" ("When I Was Young") (traditional, arr. by Donnie Munro, Chris Harley, Allan Cuthbertson) – 4:42
 "Dark Eyes" (Donnie Munro, Blair Douglas) – 4:10
 "Nothing But A Child" (Steve Earle) – 4:24
 "Georgie" (Sarah-Anne Munro) – 2:40
 "The Garden Boy" (Donnie Munro, Richard Cherns) – 6:32

1999 albums